The Susquehanna Steam Electric Station, a nuclear power station, is on the Susquehanna River in Salem Township, Luzerne County, Pennsylvania.

Operations
PPL operated the plant until June 2015 when Talen Energy was formed from PPL's competitive supply business. Harrisburg-based Allegheny Electric Cooperative purchased 10% of the plant in 1977.

Susquehanna produces 63 million kilowatt hours per day.  It has been in operation since 1983. The prime builder was Bechtel Power Corporation of Reston, Virginia. In November 2009, the Nuclear Regulatory Commission (NRC) extended the operation licenses of the reactors for an additional 20 years.

Electricity Production

Abandoned plans for an adjacent power plant
In 2008, PPL filed an application with the U.S. Nuclear Regulatory Commission for a license to build and operate a new nuclear plant under consideration near Berwick, Pennsylvania. The Bell Bend Nuclear Power Plant would be built near the company’s existing two-unit Susquehanna nuclear power plant. On August 30, 2016, Talen Energy formally requested the license application be withdrawn, and the NRC officially accepted the application withdrawal on September 22, 2016, officially cancelling the project. Unlike the existing two units, which are American-designed boiling water reactors, the plan called for the French-German EPR which is a pressurized water reactor. At 1.6 Gigawatt net electric nameplate capacity (1.66 GW in the case of Taishan nuclear power plant), the EPR is the nuclear power plant  design with the highest per-reactor electric power output ever built.

Incidents
In the plant's first emergency, an electrical fire erupted at a switch box that controls the supply of cooling water to emergency systems. No injuries were reported following the 1982 incident.

Roughly 10,000 gallons of mildly radioactive water spilled at the Station's Unit 1 turbine building after a gasket failed in the filtering system in 1985. Installed drains collect water, and is released into the air. No radiation was released from the building to the public, and no personnel were contaminated as a result of this incident.

Surrounding population

The 2010 U.S. population within  of Susquehanna was 54,686, an increase of 3.3 percent in a decade, according to an analysis of U.S. Census data for msnbc.com. The 2010 U.S. population within  was 1,765,761, an increase of 5.5 percent since 2000. Cities within 50 miles include Wilkes-Barre (18 miles to city center) and the larger city, Scranton (33 miles to center city).

Seismic risk
The NRC's estimate of the risk each year of an earthquake intense enough to cause core damage to the reactor at Susquehanna was 1 in 76,923, according to an NRC study published in August 2010.

See also

List of largest power stations in the United States

References

External links

DoE Page

Nuclear power plants in Pennsylvania
Buildings and structures in Luzerne County, Pennsylvania
Towers in Pennsylvania
Energy infrastructure completed in 1982
Energy infrastructure completed in 1984
1982 establishments in Pennsylvania